Richard Garneau,  (July 15, 1930 – January 20, 2013) was a Canadian sports journalist and writer in Quebec.

Biography
Born in Quebec City, Quebec, he was best known as the host of La Soirée du hockey, the very popular ice hockey television show in French Canada.  In a career spanning over 50 years, Garneau also covered twenty-three Olympic Games, seven Commonwealth Games and four Pan-American Games.  He was scheduled to participate in the broadcasts of the 2014 Winter Olympic Games.

Honours
In 1999, he was awarded the Foster Hewitt Memorial Award by the Hockey Hall of Fame "in recognition of his long-time work as a colour commentator on French hockey telecasts". In 2000, he was made a Knight of the National Order of Quebec. In 2005, he was made a Member of the Order of Canada.  At the 2014 Sochi Winter Olympics, he was posthumously awarded the Pierre de Coubertin medal for his work in the Olympic movement.

Selected bibliography
 À toi Richard qui colore avec humour la petite histoire de la radio et de la télévision au Québec (1992)
 Vie, rage... dangereux (1993)
 Les patins d'André (1994)
 Train de nuit pour la gloire (1995)
 À toi... Richard... prise deux. Un Québécois en Bavière (1996)

References

1930 births
2013 deaths
Canadian sportswriters
Canadian television sportscasters
Canadian non-fiction writers in French
Foster Hewitt Memorial Award winners
French Quebecers
Journalists from Quebec
Knights of the National Order of Quebec
Members of the Order of Canada
Montreal Canadiens announcers
National Hockey League broadcasters
Recipients of the Pierre de Coubertin medal
Writers from Quebec City
Canadian male non-fiction writers
20th-century Canadian people
21st-century Canadian people